Graham Ragsdale (born 28 June 1969) is a former soldier of the Canadian Forces. He commanded the sniper team from the 3rd Battalion Princess Patricia's Canadian Light Infantry attached to the United States Army 187th Infantry Regiment, 101st Airborne Division during Operation Anaconda in the Shah-i-kot Valley, Paktia Province, Afghanistan in March 2002. The sniper team recorded more than 20 kills, including the long distance record combat kill of  set by Corporal Rob Furlong. Master Corporal Ragsdale, with selfless disregard for his own personal safety, operated his sniper team through extreme weather conditions at high altitude while under direct and indirect enemy fire aiding the success of the mission by identifying and neutralizing enemy targets and saving allied lives. He was awarded the United States Bronze Star Medal  with "V" device for his actions in combat and was Mentioned in Despatches by the Canadian Forces for valiant conduct and meritorious service.

Military career
Graham Ragsdale was born on 28 June 1969 in Owen Sound, Ontario, Canada. He joined the Canadian Forces in 1988 after graduating from secondary school. During his training he completed parachute training and was posted as a paratrooper to two Commando of the now disbanded Canadian Airborne Regiment, Special Service Force (SSF). It was during this time that he gained reconnaissance, military freefall, sniper, and mountain operations qualifications.

In 1991, after his initial three year service contract, he chose to be released from the regular force and joined the Canadian Rangers Patrol Group. At this time he was also pursuing a promising amateur boxing career with Olympic hopes. He rejoined the regular force in 1996 and was posted to the newly formed 3rd Battalion Princess Patricia's Canadian Light Infantry, where he gained the mortarman, section commander, jump master, machine gunner, unarmed combat instructor, and freefall parachute instructor qualifications. He also completed the British Army pathfinder cadre and sniper badge tests. 

In 2000 he completed a tour of duty in the Former Yugoslavia with NATO's Stabilization Force, and was then given the command role of Unit Master Sniper in charge of the sniper group that in 2002 was deployed to Afghanistan as part of the US Operation Enduring Freedom and Canadian Operation Apollo.

In contrast to the accolades of American soldiers, who witnessed the snipers in action in the Shah-i-kot, a controversial decision made by the PPCLI (Princess Patricia's Canadian Light Infantry) chain-of-command removed Master Corporal Ragsdale as the sniper group leader amidst a Canadian Forces National Investigation Service (CFNIS) investigation of Master Corporal Arron Perry. Six months after the tour, a despondent Ragsdale chose to be released from the military.

Ragsdale was employed from 2005-2015 as a private military contractor with Aegis Defence Services and Tundra Group operating throughout Afghanistan and the Maghreb region of North Africa as a designated defensive marksman (DDM) and security manager. He currently resides in Alberta, Canada instructing marksmanship and field craft.

Medals and decorations
Sacrifice Medal (replacing the previously awarded Wound Stripe) – Afghanistan
South-West Asia Service Medal
Special Service Medal – Rangers and Alert
Canadian Peacekeeping Service Medal
NATO SFOR Medal – Former Yugoslavia
Bronze Star Medal with "V" device (United States)
Mentioned in Despatches
Commander-in-Chief Unit Commendation

References
 Naylor, Sean. "Not a Good Day to Die" Penguin Group (New York), 2005
 Pegler, Martin. "Out of Nowhere – A History of Military Snipers" Osprey Publishing, 2006
 Friscolanti, Michael. "We Were Abandoned" Maclean's, Rogers Publishing, 2006-05-15
 Krott, Rob. "Canadian Snipers Take Out Taliban" Soldier of Fortune, 2002–08
 3rd Battalion, Princess Patricia's Canadian Light Infantry

Living people
Canadian military snipers
Kincardine, Ontario
Canadian Army soldiers
Canadian military personnel of the War in Afghanistan (2001–2021)
1969 births